Gardner Creek is a community in Saint John County, New Brunswick, Canada.

History

Notable people

See also
List of communities in New Brunswick

References
 
 Geographical Names of Canada - Gardner Creek

Communities in Saint John County, New Brunswick